Blepephaeus indicus is a species of beetle in the family Cerambycidae. It was described by Stephan von Breuning in 1935. It is known from India.

References

Blepephaeus
Beetles described in 1935